Middlebury Union High School (MUHS) is an Addison Central Unified School District public high school in Middlebury, Vermont. Located at 73 Charles Avenue, it had 537 students  in grades 9–12 for the  2019–2020 school year.

The high school has a newspaper, the "Tiger's Print," that is published 4-6 times a year as a supplement to the local Addison Independent newspaper, and online. The school's mascot is the tiger, and its colors are black and orange. The high school dates back to the 19th-century.

References

External links
 Middlebury Union High School website

Public high schools in Vermont
Schools in Addison County, Vermont

International Baccalaureate schools in Vermont